François Clément Sauvage was a French geologist and mining engineer. He was born in Sedan on 4 April 1814 and died in Paris on 11 November 1872.

Sauvage's name is one of the 72 names on the Eiffel Tower.

1814 births
1872 deaths
Commandeurs of the Légion d'honneur
French geologists
French people in rail transport